Love Will Find a Way may refer to:

"Love Will Find a Way" (Pablo Cruise song) (1978)
"Love Will Find a Way" (1983), a song by Lionel Richie from Can't Slow Down
"(Love Will) Find a Way" (Amy Grant song) (1985)
"Love Will Find a Way" (Yes song) (1987)
"Love Will Find a Way" (1990), a song by Donovan from Rising
"Love Will Find a Way" (Disney song) (1998), a 1998 song from The Lion King II: Simba's Pride
"Love Will Find a Way" (1999), a song by Christina Aguilera from Christina Aguilera
"Love Will Find a Way" (Bardot song) (2002)
"Love Will Find a Way" (Delirious? song) (2008)
"Love Will Find a Way" from the operetta The Maid of the Mountains by Harold Fraser-Simson, which was first seen in London in 1917
"Love Will Find a Way", a song by Eubie Blake and Noble Sissle from the Broadway musical Shuffle Along (1921)
Love Will Find a Way (Philip Bailey album), (2019)
Love Will Find a Way (Pharoah Sanders album) (1978)